International Christian School may refer to:
International Christian School (Caracas), Venezuela
International Christian School (Hong Kong)
International Christian School of Budapest, Hungary
International Christian School, Uijeongbu, South Korea

See also
 International Christian Academy (disambiguation)